Hop Fastpass is a contactless smart card for public transit fare payment on most transit modes in the Portland, Oregon, metropolitan area including MAX Light Rail, WES commuter rail, Portland Streetcar, The Vine, and all TriMet and C-TRAN buses. An initial release to the general public began on July 5, 2017, with the official launch on July 17. The program is managed by TriMet.

The Hop card is a purple credit card-sized stored-value contactless smartcard that can hold a cash value or day or monthly passes for various systems. Because all terminals that read Hop cards can also accept NFC-based mobile payment, "virtual" Hop cards are available for use on any iOS or Android smartphone supporting Apple Pay or Google Wallet respectively; these are functionally identical to physical cards. Day or month passes allowing unlimited rides within the given time frame can be "earned" by purchasing an amount in single fares equal to the cost of the pass; a year pass, which costs as much as 11 earned month passes, can also be purchased up-front. Passengers must tap on each time they enter the system by holding the card to an electronic reader to validate a pass or deduct funds. Cards can be reloaded using a credit or debit card online, using a mobile app, calling a toll-free number, or at local retailers and ticket offices. Cash can be used when reloading the card in person.

Background

Prior to the introduction of electronic payments on the network, paper tickets and passes were used by Portland-area transit agencies. The tickets needed to be validated at ticket validators on the Streetcar or at MAX and WES stations. They did not offer fare exchange or extension. Installation of Hop readers began in March 2015, and was completed by the end of 2016. A public beta began in February 2017. The system cost $35.9 million to install and test at the time of its public release.

Technology

The Hop Card uses ISO 14443-compliant RFID technology allowing the card to be read/written without direct contact. The card uses the NXP/Philips MIFARE DESFire EV1 256B. Hop Card readers can also read information from contactless bank cards and mobile wallets.

Brand
The card's initial design is an ISO 7810 standard-sized purple card, with the Hop logo, and the logos of the three participating transit agencies at the top, and a colored bar at the bottom. The colored bar indicates the type of card: purple for standard adult fares, green for "honored citizen" which includes seniors, low-income riders, and riders with disabilities, and orange for youth cards. Cards also have a hole punched in them for use with a lanyard.

The Hop name was chosen in September 2015, beating out other candidates, including 1Pass, Indigo, Umbrella, Via and Lynx, that were proposed in 2014. Its name references both rabbits and the hops used in craft beers brewed in Portland.

Sales

Hop cards can be purchased at any participating transit agencies' ticket offices, as well as local grocery and convenience stores.

Use

The card must be tapped each time the system is entered or a transfer is made. It can be tapped on boarding a bus or streetcar, or tapped before boarding the light rail, commuter rail, or BRT. On tapping the card a display shows the time remaining on the current ticket or pass. It also displays any relevant low-balance alerts with an audible sound. There is no penalty for tapping the card more than once within the duration of a ticket. Unlike some systems, there is no need to tap out when leaving the system since fare is the same regardless of the point of exit.

Ticketing/pricing

The network's fares are time-based rather than distance or segment-based. Tickets are available for unlimited travel over the course of 2.5 hours, one day, one month, or one year. Hop's fare capping system  prevents riders from being charged more than the cost of a day pass during one day, or the cost of a monthly pass in the course of a month. This allows riders the benefits of a day or a monthly pass without the upfront cost, or the need to purchase one in advance. 

The card can be reloaded online, over the phone, or with the Hop app using a credit or debit card. It can also be reloaded using a credit card or cash anywhere it can be purchased. Hop cards do not expire (except honored citizen cards, which must be renewed every two years). Once a loaded pass expires it can be reloaded with a new one. TriMet has said it projects a card will last 10 years.

Mobile wallets

On May 21, 2019 TriMet announced that Hop could be added to Google Wallet and Apple Wallet by using the Hop Fastpass app on either Android or iOS. Hop was the first transit card in North America to launch availability in both Google Wallet and Apple Wallet. Virtual Hop cards are functionally identical to their physical counterparts, allowing for the same fare capping rules, and allowing riders to purchase concession fares. Hop also allows riders to convert physical cards onto either mobile payment system.

See also
List of smart cards

Notes

References

External links

Fare collection systems in the United States
Contactless smart cards
Public transportation in Oregon
2017 establishments in Oregon
2017 establishments in Washington (state)
TriMet
Transportation in Clark County, Washington